Syed Mojahidur Rahman is a Bangladeshi politician and the former Member of Parliament of Undivided Khulna-1 (Current Bagerhat-1).

Career
Rahman was elected to parliament from Khulna-1 as a Bangladesh Nationalist Party candidate in 1979. He then joined the Jatiya Party. He lost the Jatiya Sangsad elections of 1986 Bagerhat-1 constituency with the nomination of Jatiya Party.

References

Bangladesh Nationalist Party politicians
Living people
2nd Jatiya Sangsad members
Year of birth missing (living people)
Jatiya Party politicians